Hanife Demiryol (born September 19, 1992) is a Turkish women's football midfielder currently playing in the Turkish Women's Second Football League for Akdeniz Nurçelik Spor with jersey number 91. She was a member of the Turkish women's national team.

Playing career

Club

Hanife Demiryol obtained her license on April 28, 2006. She played in the youth team of Bucaspor in her hometown before she was admitted to the senior team to play in the Turkish Women's First League with her club. She capped 54 times and scored 33 goals with Bucaspor until the end of the 2010–11 season. Demiryol transferred to Kdz. Ereğlispor for the 2011–12 season. After playing in 21 matches and netting 11 goals, she moved to Ataşehir Belediyespor in Istanbul, where she played three seasons between 2012 and 2015. After a brief appearance for Konak Belediyespor in İzmir in the 2015–16 season, she transferred to Osmaniye Demirspor to play in the Second League. Demiryol joined Balıkesir Büyükşehir Belediyespor, a team in the Women's Third League in the same season, where she played one season.

After staying away two seasons from the football pitch, she joined Istanbul-based Akdeniz Nurçelik Spor to play in the Women's Second League.

International
Demiryol was part of the Turkey women's national under-17 team between 2006 and 2008. She capped 14 times and scored 3 goals for the girls' national team. In the years 2009–2010, she played for the Turkey women's national under-19 team, in total 12 times netting 6 goals.

She was called up to the Turkey women's national team and debuted at the 2015 FIFA Women's World Cup qualification – UEFA Group 6 match against Wales on April 4, 2014.

Career statistics
.

Honours
Turkish Women's First League
 Bucaspor
 Runners-up (1): 2008–09

 Kdz. Ereğlispor
 Third place (1): 2011–12

 Ataşehir Belediyespor
 Runners-up (4): 2012–13, 2013–14, 2014–15, 2015–16

References

External links
 

Living people
1992 births
People from Konak
Footballers from İzmir
Turkish women's footballers
Women's association football midfielders
Bucaspor women's players
Karadeniz Ereğlispor players
Ataşehir Belediyespor players
Konak Belediyespor players
Turkey women's international footballers
Akdeniz Nurçelik Spor players